is a Japanese voice actress best known as the voice of Cordelia Glauca in the media franchise Tantei Opera Milky Holmes, the voice of Tomoko Kuroki in No Matter How I Look at It, It's You Guys' Fault I'm Not Popular!, and the voice of Rainbow Dash in the Japanese dub of My Little Pony: Friendship Is Magic. Her first maxi single, "Colorful Garden" was released on April 6, 2011. Kitta attended Dwango Creative School, a voice actor training school in 2007. After leaving Dwango Artist Production, she is now affiliated with Hibiki Cast. In 2017 she published her first manga, in yuri magazine Galette, illustrated by Moto Momono.

On November 27, 2021, Kitta announced on her LINE blog that she had married an Italian whom she had met while studying in London.

Filmography

Anime
{| class="wikitable sortable plainrowheaders"
|+ List of voice performances in anime
! Year
! Series
! Role
! class="unsortable"| Notes
! class="unsortable"| Source
|-
|  || Angel Tales || Ayumi (Turtle) || ||
|-
|  || Onegai My Melody Kirara Tsu || Natalie || || 
|-
|  || Slayers Revolution || Villagers, Female customers, children || || 
|-
|  || Hell Girl: Three Vessels || Nozomi Bitou || || 
|-
|  || Hakushaku to Yōsei || Banshee's voice (ep 4); Maid (eps 8, 12) || || 
|-
|  || Slayers Evolution-R || Villagers, Townspeople, Taforashia people || || 
|-
|  || Jewelpet || Ryoko Azabu || || 
|-
|  || Weiß Survive || Michi || || 
|-
|  || Aoi Hana || Waitress, Clerk, Staff || || 
|-
|  || A Certain Scientific Railgun || Various episodic characters || || 
|-
|  || Weiß Survive R || Michi || || 
|-
|  || B Gata H Kei || Aoi Katase || || 
|-
| –15 || Tantei Opera Milky Holmes series || Cordelia Glauca || Lead role || 
|-
|  || Freezing || Creo Brand || || 
|-
| –14 || Cardfight!! Vanguard series || Misaki Tokura || Lead role || 
|-
|  || Dragon Crisis! || Mao Aikawa || || 
|-
|  || Brave 10 || Benmaru, Rokuro Mochizuki || || 
|-
|  ||  || Schoolgirl || || 
|-
|  || Shining Hearts: Shiawase no Pan || Queen || || 
|-
|  || Wooser's Hand-to-Mouth Life || Cordelia Glauca || || 
|-
|  || World War Blue || Zarufa Opal || || 
|-
|  || Love Live! || Student council || || 
|-
|  || Devil Survivor 2: The Animation || Poltergeist, Ririmu, Sarasuvuati || || 
|-
|  || No Matter How I Look at It, It's You Guys' Fault I'm Not Popular! || Tomoko Kuroki || Lead role || 
|-
|  || Freezing Vibration || Jina Purpleton || || 
|-
|  || Tokyo Ravens || Suzu Saotome || || 
|-
|  || Neppu Kairiku Bushi Road || Hana || || 
|-
|  || Recently, My Sister Is Unusual || Minami-sensei || || 
|-
| –15 || Future Card Buddyfight series || Noboru Kodo || || 
|-
|  || Engaged to the Unidentified || Schoolgirl || || 
|-
|  || Robot Girls Z || Miyari || || 
|-
|  || Gigant Big-Shot Tsukasa || Manabu Numata || Lead role || 
|-
|  || Maido! Urayasu Tekkin Kazoku || Sakura Osawagi || || 
|-
|  || Cardfight!! Vanguard: The Movie || Misaki Tokura || Lead role, feature film || 
|-
|  || Rin-ne || Bijin hisho || || 
|-
|  || Triage X || Yuu Momokino || || 
|-
|  || Chivalry of a Failed Knight || Yuri Oriki || ||
|-
|  || PriPara || Tina || ||
|-
|  || Luck & Logic || Nemesis || || 
|-
|  || Onigiri || Kaguya || || 
|-
|  || BanG Dream! || Rii Uzawa || || 
|-
|}

Video games

Overseas dubs

Bibliography
 Liberty'' (2017 – ongoing)

Notes

References

External links
Official agency profile 
Izumi Kitta filmography at Game Plaza Haruka 

1984 births
Living people
Anime singers
Japanese video game actresses
Japanese voice actresses
Milky Holmes members
Voice actresses from Tokyo
21st-century Japanese women singers
21st-century Japanese singers
21st-century Japanese actresses
Manga writers